Jackson Avenue station can refer to:
 Jackson Avenue station (IRT White Plains Road Line), a New York City Subway station on the 
 Martin Luther King Drive station, a Hudson–Bergen Light Rail station formerly known as Jackson Avenue
 Vernon Boulevard–Jackson Avenue station, a New York City Subway station on the